Vasyl Onopenko (born 10 April 1949) is a Ukrainian judge, and politician.

Onopenko is from Vinnytsia Oblast. He graduated the Kharkiv Law Institute in 1975 and later a candidate dissertation in 1994. In 1976-1981 Onopenko was a judge of the Lityn Raion court, later in the Chernihiv Oblast court. In 1985-1991 he was a judge of the Supreme Court of Ukraine.

In 1992 he was appointed a Minister of Justice of Ukraine (Kuchma government, Second Masol government). At the post in 1994 Onopenko created own political party, the Party of Human Rights. Sometime in 1995 his party was united with Social Democratic Party of Ukraine and Ukrainian Party of Justice into Social Democratic Party of Ukraine (united). He was elected the chairman of the newly created political party. Due to inadequate investigation of events of July 1995 (related to burial of Volodymyr (Romaniuk)), in August 1995 Onopenko resigned.

Soon after being elected to Verkhovna Rada at the 1998 parliamentary elections, Onopenko was excluded from SDPU(u) and created yet another party the Ukrainian Social Democratic Party joining the "Independents" group in parliament and then "Batkivshchyna". In 1999 presidential elections he ran for the President of Ukraine post.

During the 2002 parliamentary elections Onopenko returned to parliament on the party list from Yulia Tymoshenko Bloc being #4 on the list. Soon after being elected, for a short time he was unaffiliated, but then rejoined the parliamentary faction.

For the 2006 parliamentary elections he again ran on the party list from BYuT listed #4. Later Onopenko resigned as a parliamentary (People's Deputy of Ukraine) after being elected to chairman of the Supreme Court of Ukraine. At the end of 2006 his son-in-law replaced him as a leader of the Ukrainian Social Democratic Party.

Onopenko quit the Ukrainian Social Democratic Party after Nataliya Korolevska changed it to Ukraine – Forward! in 2012.

In 2012 parliamentary elections Onopenko ran as unaffiliated and unsuccessful.

References

External links
 Vasyl Onopenko at the Official Ukraine Today

1949 births
Living people
People from Vinnytsia Oblast
Yaroslav Mudryi National Law University alumni
20th-century Ukrainian judges
Judges of the Supreme Court of Ukraine
Social Democratic Party of Ukraine (united) politicians
Candidates in the 1999 Ukrainian presidential election
Justice ministers of Ukraine
Third convocation members of the Verkhovna Rada
Fourth convocation members of the Verkhovna Rada
Fifth convocation members of the Verkhovna Rada
Ukraine – Forward! politicians